The 1967 NCAA University Division Swimming and Diving Championships were contested in March 1967 at McCaffree Pool at Michigan State University in East Lansing, Michigan at the 44th annual NCAA-sanctioned swim meet to determine the team and individual national champions of University Division men's collegiate swimming and diving in the United States.

Stanford topped the team standings for the first time, finishing fifteen points ahead of four-time defending champions USC. This was the Indians' first title in program history.

Team standings
Note: Top 10 only
(H) = Hosts
Full results

See also
List of college swimming and diving teams

References

NCAA Division I Men's Swimming and Diving Championships
NCAA University Division Swimming And Diving Championships
NCAA University Division Swimming And Diving Championships
NCAA University Division Swimming And Diving Championships